Nasyam Mohammed Farooq (born 15 May 1950) is an Indian politician who served as the 9th chairperson of the Andhra Pradesh Legislative Council. Farooq is a nominated member of the Andhra Pradesh Legislative Council and is a member of the TDP.

Political career
He was the cabinet minister for Health education and minority welfare in Government of Andhra Pradesh, serving from November 2018 till May 2019.

He is a senior minority TDP politician since the formation of TDP and as minister for Sugar, Wakf minority welfare and Urdu Academy in N. T. Rama Rao's cabinet in 1984 ministry and 1994 to 2004 he served as deputy speaker and Municipal urban development minority welfare and Higher education minister in Chandrababu Naidu cabinet. He previously served as a councillor as well as vice chairman of Nandyal Municipality and member of Andhra Pradesh Legislative Assembly. On 10 November 2018, he was inducted into the cabinet by Chief Minister Chandrababu Naidu after serving as the Chairman of the Andhra Pradesh Legislative Council for nearly one year. After that he served as the Health and minority empowerment minister in Government of Andhra Pradesh.

Chandrababu Naidu said that Mr. N.M.D. Farooq had vast political experience of 40 years and Mr. Farooq had earlier served under several Ministries in NTR cabinet and Chandrababu Naidu cabinet and the Chairman of the Legislative Council of Andhra Pradesh.

References

External links 

 Member's Information

People from Nandyal
Telugu Desam Party politicians
Members of the Andhra Pradesh Legislative Assembly
Members of the Andhra Pradesh Legislative Council
Living people
21st-century Indian politicians
Andhra Pradesh politicians
Deputy Speakers of the Andhra Pradesh Legislative Assembly
Chairs of the Andhra Pradesh Legislative Council
1950 births